The Attawapiskat River is a river in Kenora District in northwestern Ontario, Canada, that flows east from Attawapiskat Lake to James Bay. It is the third largest river entirely in Ontario.

Course
It is the third largest river entirely in Ontario.

The main rivers flowing into the lake that are thus part of the Attawapiskat River drainage basin are the Marten-Drinking River, the Otoskwin River and the Pineimuta River.

There are two outflows from the Attawapiskat Lake into the Attawapiskat River: a southern and a northern channel. The southern channel is named by the Atlas of Canada as the Attawapiskat River, and is the source location listed in the Infobox at right. The northern channel is named by the Atlas of Canada as the North Channel, and is the more easily navigated route for canoeing. The elevation of the river drops significantly along these two outflow channels, descending from the higher ground of the Canadian Shield to the flatter and more boggy Hudson Bay Lowlands.

Further downstream, the river then heads east once again.

Geology
The formations are unique to the region, the Swampy Cree (Omushkegowuk) word for which, tawâpiskâ (as "kâh-tawâpiskâk" in its Conjunct form and as "êh-tawâpiskât" in its Participle form), gives name to the river.

The Attawapiskat kimberlite field lies astride the river.

Economy
Otoskwin/Attawapiskat River Provincial Park includes parts of the river from Attawapiskat Lake to a point just upstream of the confluence with the Muketei River.

The mine was expected to produce  of diamonds a year.

Tributaries
Missisa River (right)
Muketei River (left)
Streatfeild River (right)
North Channel (left)
Attawapiskat Lake (source)
Otoskwin River
Marten-Drinking River
Pineimuta River

See also
List of longest rivers of Canada
List of rivers of Ontario

References

Sources

External links
River islands formed of ancient reefs, Attawapiskat River, Ontario & Cliff-bound islands, Attawapiskat River, Ontario ("Birthday Cakes" limestone islands), and Mouth of Attawapiskat River, James Bay coast, Ontario. Photos from the Ontario - Hudson Bay Lowlands section of the Canadian Landscapes Photo Collection, Geological Survey of Canada, Natural Resources Canada. Retrieved 2009-08-18.
"Attawapiskat River". The Canadian Encyclopedia.

Rivers of Kenora District
Tributaries of James Bay